Castel dell'Ovo ("Egg Castle") is a seafront castle in Naples, located on the former island of Megaride, now a peninsula, on the Gulf of Naples in Italy. The castle's name comes from a legend about the Roman poet Virgil, who had a reputation in the Middle Ages as a great sorcerer and predictor of the future. In the legend, Virgil put a magical egg into the foundations to support the fortifications. It remains there along with his bones, and had this egg been broken, the castle would have been destroyed and a series of disastrous events for Naples would have followed. The castle is located between the districts of San Ferdinando and Chiaia, facing Mergellina across the sea.

History during the Roman era 

The Castel dell'Ovo is the oldest castle in Naples. The island of Megaride was where Greek colonists from Cumae founded the original nucleus of the city in the 6th century BC. Its location offers an excellent view of the Naples waterfront and the surrounding area.

In the 1st century BC, the Roman patrician Lucius Licinius Lucullus built part of the magnificent villa, later called Castellum Lucullanum, on the site.

Fortified by Valentinian III in the mid-5th century, it was the site to which the last western Roman emperor, Romulus Augustulus, was exiled in 476. Eugippius founded a monastery on the site after 492.

History from Norman to Napoleonic conquests

The remains of the Roman-era structures and later fortifications were demolished by local residents in the 9th century to prevent their use by Saracen raiders. The first castle on the site was built by the Normans in the 12th century. Roger the Norman, conquering Naples in 1140, made Castel dell'Ovo his seat. The importance of the Castel dell'Ovo began to decline when king Charles I of Anjou (r. 1266–85) built a new castle, Castel Nuovo, and moved his court there. Castel dell'Ovo became the seat of the Royal Chamber and of the State Treasury. It also served as a prison. In 1191, Empress Constance of the Holy Roman Empire, daughter of Roger, was captured during her struggle with her nephew Tancred, King of Sicily for the crown of Sicily, and Sicilian Chancellor Matthew d'Ajello wrote to Tancred persuading him to lock her in the island Castel dell'Ovo to be better-guarded and secluded from people, and wrote to nobleman Aligerno Cottone in charge of defending Naples ordering him to "ut imperatricem in Castro Salvatoris ad mare benè custodiat" (guard the empress in "Castle of the Savior" (i. e. Castel dell'Ovo) in the sea properly). However, Constance was released the next year and finally became Queen of Sicily. In 1268, King Conradin was imprisoned here before his trial and execution. Also imprisoned here were children of Manfred, King of Sicily after his failure. In 1381, Queen Joanna I of Naples was also imprisoned there for a time after having been forced to surrender to her enemy Charles of Durazzo, the future Charles III of Naples, before her assassination.

The current appearance dates from the Aragonese domination (15th century). It was struck by French and Spanish artillery during the Italian Wars; in the Neapolitan Republic of 1799 its guns were used by rebels to deter the philo-Bourbon population of the city.

After a long period of decay, the site got its current appearance following an extensive renovation project started in 1975.

Present

In the 19th century, a small fishing village called Borgo Marinaro, which is still extant, developed around the castle's eastern wall. It is now known for its marina and restaurants. The castle is rectangular in plan, approximately 200 by 45 metres at its widest, with a high bastion overlooking the causeway that connects it to the shore; the causeway is more than 100 metres long and a popular location for newlyweds to have their wedding photos taken. Several buildings are often used for exhibitions and other special events inside the castle walls. Behind the castle, there is a long promontory once probably used as a docking area. A large round tower stands outside the castle walls to the southeast.

Underwater archaeologists have discovered what appears to be a 2500-year-old harbor associated with the origins of the first Greek settlement of Paleopolis (which preceded the ancient city of Neapolis, now Naples) in the sea next to the castle. Four tunnels, a 10-foot-wide street demonstrating furrows consistent with cart traffic, and a trench likely built as a defensive structure for soldiers were submerged immediately adjacent to the castle. The discovery was announced in March 2018, after the September 2017 identification of the original port of Neapolis.

References

Bibliography

External links 
 

12th-century fortifications
15th-century fortifications
Castles in Naples
Tourist attractions in Naples
Colonies of Magna Graecia
Cumaean colonies
Romulus Augustulus
Archaeological sites in Naples